Green Man Brewery is a microbrewery located in Dunedin, New Zealand established in 2006. Green Man produces a range of beers and prides itself on its strict use of organic ingredients and batch brewing. Green Man also considers itself as a sustainable brewery, relying on an on site bottle recycling plant.

In 2008, their beers won two gold medals, one silver and a best-in-class at the BrewNZ Beer Awards.

Radler Controversy
Green Man brewery was threatened with legal action by Monteith's Brewery over the use of Monteith's trade marked name 'Radler'. An application by the Society of Beer Advocates to have the brewery's Radler trademark revoked has been issued on the basis that the term Radler is an historic style of beer and can therefore not be owned.

See also 
 Beer in New Zealand

References

External links
 Green Man Brewery

Breweries of New Zealand
Companies based in Dunedin
New Zealand companies established in 2006
Food and drink companies established in 2006